Naty is a given name. Notable people with the name include:

 Naty Alvarado, American former handball player
 Naty Bernardo (1911-1987), Filipino actress
 Naty Botero (born 1980), Colombian model and singer
 Naty Crame-Rogers (1922-2021), Filipina actress, drama teacher, writer, producer, and researcher
 Naty Rangel (born 1988), Mexican badminton player
 Naty Rozario, Hong Kong former international lawn bowler
 Naty Saidoff (born c. 1957), Israeli-born American diamond dealer, real estate investor, and philanthropist

See also
 Natty (disambiguation)